Yunesi (also Romanized as Yūnosī and Yūnsi) is a city and capital of Yunesi District, in Bajestan County, Razavi Khorasan Province, Iran. At the 2006 census, its population was 3,349, in 947 families.

References 

Populated places in Bajestan County
Cities in Razavi Khorasan Province